Slatedale is an unincorporated community and census-designated place (CDP) in Washington Township in Lehigh County, Pennsylvania. As of the 2010 census, it had a population of 455. It is part of the Lehigh Valley, which had a population of 861,899 and was the 68th most populous metropolitan area in the U.S. as of the 2020 census.

Geography
Slatedale is in northern Lehigh County, west of the center of Washington Township. Both Slatedale and Slatington are named after the large amount of slate found in the area.

Trout Creek forms the southern border of the community and flows east to the Lehigh River in Slatington. Blue Mountain rises  to the north.

Services
Slatedale is served by the Citizen's Fire Co #1 in Slatedale for fire protection and Northern Valley EMS for ambulance services.  While it has its own box post office with the ZIP Code of 18079, surrounding areas use the Slatington ZIP Code of 18080.

References

Census-designated places in Lehigh County, Pennsylvania